Reginald Summerhayes (1897–1965) was a Western Australian architect, Military Cross recipient, and president of the Royal Institute of Architects of Western Australia. Summerhayes designed a range of Perth 20th century landmarks, including the Perth Dental Hospital, Lake Karrinyup Country Club, the Colonial Mutual Insurance building in St Georges Terrace, and the bell tower of Loreto Convent, Claremont – relocated to William Street in 1992.

Life
Reginald Summerhayes was born 19 February 1897 at Bernard Street, Claremont to the architect Edwin Summerhayes and his wife Florence. Summerhayes graduated from Scotch College in 1913 as dux, and won an exhibition, for Ancient Greek and Latin, to the University of Western Australia (UWA). Summerhayes studied engineering at UWA, as there wasn't any architecture courses available in the state at the time. Summerhayes excelled at his studied, winning the Neil McNeil Scholarship in engineering in 1914 following his examinations, and in the subsequent year's exams he earned a distinction in "Engineering Drawing & Design".

In 1916, Summerhayes left his studies, determined to fight in the War. Unable to join the Australian forces due to his age, he travelled by ship to the United Kingdom, where he joined the Royal Engineers in March 1916. Summerhayes served until 1919, including deployment to France; he was awarded a Military Cross in 1918, presented at Buckingham Palace on his 21st birthday: 

After the war, Summerhayes returned to his studies at UWA in 1920, and graduated with a Bachelor of Science in Engineering in April 1921. Summerhayes spent several years in Singapore, living an effervescent life in stark contrast to his wartime experiences. He worked as an assistant architect for the Swan and Maclaren architectural firm, one of the oldest in Singapore. Summerhayes eventually rose to the position of managing architect of the Malay States branch at Kuala Lumpur by 1925.

Summerhayes returned to Perth in 1924 or 1926, joining his father's architectural firm at the elder Summerhayes' suggestion, where they mainly designed residential buildings. In November 1927 he married Sheila Kathleen Durack at St Patrick's Church, West Perth. The following September their children, twins Eve and Geoffrey were born. His father Edwin retired in 1934, and as the 1930s depression ended, Summerhayes took on more commercial and public sector works.

Summerhayes became involved with the Royal Institute of Architects of Western Australia (RIAWA), first as secretary from 1931–1934,  and later as president, elected March 1937. In 1939, he was primarily responsible for RIAWA starting The Architect, a journal that remained in publication.

Summerhayes returned to the military for World War Two, in a non-active service role as a Lieutenant Colonel in the Australian Army. In the following years, his architectural business grew, and he founded Summerhayes & Associates in 1952. That same year, he was elected a Fellow of the Royal Institute of British Architects, in honour of his service to Western Australian architecture. In 1953 Summerhayes's son Geoffrey, who also became an architect, joined his father's firm. Reginald Summerhayes died, aged 68, on 28 November 1965.

Works
In the early years of his career, Summerhayes designed residential buildings in the Inter-War Old English architectural style, such as the 1929 "Georgian" residence in Dalkeith, for Malcolm Plaistowe, the 1936 "Interlaken" house in Mosman Park for Mrs I.B. Rowley, and his own 1929 house at the southern corner of Stirling Highway and Wilson Street in Claremont.

In the mid-1930s he worked on buildings included the Physics and Chemistry Science Building at UWA, opened in 1935; new council chambers for the Town of Claremont, whose earlier chambers were built by his father; and in a supervisory role, the 1936 Colonial Mutual Life Assurance Society Building (on the corner of St Georges Terrace and Sherwood Court), and it's 1937 11-storey companion building, Lawson Flats on Sherwood Court.

By 1937, Summerhayes had been successful in various architectural competitions, including a flats and professional chambers for UWA, Wagin's town hall, Perth Dental Hospital, Lake Karrinyup Country Club, and in conjunction with sculpture Edward Kohler, an equestrian statue of King George V for Brisbane Town Hall.
He designed church buildings in a Romanesque style, for the new buildings at Loreto College Swanbourne at Claremont in 1937, All Hallows' Church in Inglewood in 1938, and St Joseph's Catholic Church in Manjimup built 1953–55.
Summerhayes also designed multiple hotels built in 1940, including Highway Hotel in Claremont, the Civic Hotel in Inglewood, and the Swanbourne Hotel.

Legacy
Various buildings designed by Summerhayes have been demolished, but one of his prominent works – the bell tower of Loreto Convent, Claremont – was relocated to William Street in 1992. The rebuilding and restoration project was performed by the Holmes à Court family company, Heytesbury Holdings, supervised by Summerhayes's son Geoffrey.

References

Further reading
 

Architects from Western Australia
1897 births
1965 deaths